Ted Mahan (born September 7, 1955) is an American former college baseball coach and catcher. He was the head baseball coach at Michigan State University from 1996 to 2005 and at Olivet College from 2007 to 2016.

Head coaching record

References

1955 births
Living people
Baseball catchers
Michigan State Spartans baseball coaches
Michigan Wolverines baseball coaches
Michigan Wolverines baseball players
Olivet Comets baseball coaches
People from Davison, Michigan
Baseball players from Michigan